Vania Beccaria  (born ) is a retired Italian female volleyball player. She was part of the Italy women's national volleyball team.

She participated in the 1994 FIVB Volleyball Women's World Championship. 
She played at the 1997 Women's European Volleyball Championship and 2001 Women's European Volleyball Championship squads.
On club level she played with Latte Rugiada Matera.

Clubs
 Latte Rugiada Matera (1994)

References

1973 births
Living people
Italian women's volleyball players
Place of birth missing (living people)